Justice Black may refer to:

 Hugo Lafayette Black, associate justice of the United States Supreme Court from 1937 to 1971
 Charles C. Black, associate justice of the New Jersey Supreme Court
 Eugene F. Black, associate justice of the Michigan Supreme Court
 Francis Marion Black, associate justice of the Supreme Court of Missouri
 Jeremiah S. Black, chief justice of the Supreme Court of Pennsylvania from 1851 to 1854
 John Black (U.S. senator), associate justice of the Mississippi Supreme Court

See also
Judge Black (disambiguation)